Divergence is a 2005 Hong Kong action-crime film produced and directed by Benny Chan, from a screenplay by Ivy Ho. The film stars Aaron Kwok, Ekin Cheng and Daniel Wu.

Plot
It is about three people (a cop, a lawyer and a killer) who cross paths after the murder of a federal witness and a kidnapping of a pop star.

CID Suen Siu-yan (Aaron Kwok) arrests the accountant of a money launderer. However, the accountant is assassinated upon his arrival in the Hong Kong airport. The killer Coke (Daniel Wu) escapes without leaving any clues. While the masterminded laundry head (Gallen Lo) is happy about the soon resumption of his frozen assets for the death of his unfavorable witness, his fond son Xia is kidnapped suddenly.

Suen is an ill-fated CID. He can't forget his loving girlfriend (Angelica Lee) who disappeared 10 years ago and has not yet been found. During investigation, he finds a woman (Angelica Lee) who looks very much alike with his missing girlfriend. The woman is the wife of the lawyer To (Ekin Cheng) who represents the laundry head. It raises his interest in the couple.

Although the killer Coke has completed his job, he can't help feeling great interest in the case and it violates the code of killers. He does it because years ago Suen was the host of the Police Call which leave him great impression. And he knows why Suen's girlfriend disappeared 10 years ago.

The lawyer To is very successful in his field. He always wins cases in the court and helps the suspects escape from prison terms. Will there be a hidden side for an arrogant person like him? Everyone in the story seems to possess some qualities that don't suit their identity. Will it engulf them into the whirlpool?

Simultaneously, there are many other crimes around the city. Unknown motivated murders and disappearances are plentiful. Will the cases related to the 3 characters of the story?

Cast
 Aaron Kwok as Suen Siu-yan
 Ekin Cheng as To Hou-san
 Daniel Wu as Koo/Coke
 Gallen Lo as Yiu Tin-chung
 Angelica Lee as Siu-fong / Amy
 Ning Jing as Ting
 Eric Tsang as Uncle Choi
 Yu Rongguang as Inspector Mok
 Tommy Yuen as Yiu Ha
 Samuel Pang as So Fu-on
 Jan Lamb as Detective Chu
 Sam Lee as Leung Tak
 Lam Suet as Mou Wai-bun

Awards and nominations

External links 
 
 

2005 films
Hong Kong crime action films
2000s crime action films
Police detective films
2000s Cantonese-language films
Films directed by Benny Chan
Films about contract killing
Films set in Hong Kong
Films shot in Hong Kong
2000s Hong Kong films